Joseph Benton Steffy, Jr. (April 3, 1926 – May 22, 2011) was an American football player. He went to fight in the Korean War and received the Bronze Star Medal and the Purple Heart. Steffy was inducted into the College Football Hall of Fame.

Early life
Steffy was born in Chattanooga, Tennessee on April 3, 1926. He attended the University of Tennessee, where he played on the football team for one season in 1944. That year, the Volunteers went undefeated in the regular season, but lost to Southern California in the Rose Bowl. The following year, he enrolled at the United States Military Academy, where he played for the Army football team for three seasons as an offensive guard and as a center on defense. The Cadets went undefeated in 1945 and 1946. In 1947, Steffy was named team captain.

Military service
He graduated from USMA in 1949. In April 1950, he married Ann née Brown. As a lieutenant, Steffy served in the Korean War, where he suffered frostbite and was wounded in the foot by a grenade. Due to his injuries, he was evacuated from Hungnam to Japan, and later awarded the Bronze Star Medal.

Later life
After the war, Steffy served on the Army football staff as the freshman team coach. He later owned a car dealership in Newburgh, New York. With his wife, who died in 2004, he had one son. Steffy died of a heart ailment on May 22, 2011 in Newburgh, New York at age of 85.

References

External links

1926 births
2011 deaths
Sportspeople from Chattanooga, Tennessee
Players of American football from Tennessee
American football offensive guards
Tennessee Volunteers football players
Army Black Knights football players
All-American college football players
College Football Hall of Fame inductees
United States Army personnel of the Korean War
United States Army officers